A Night in London is a live concert video by Mark Knopfler released on VHS tape and Laserdisc in 1996 by PolyGram Music and on DVD in 2003 by Universal Music. The setlist includes songs from Knopfler's first solo album, Golden Heart, along with well-known Dire Straits numbers and film themes composed by the artist.

Track listing
 "Darling Pretty" – 5:39
 "Walk of Life" – 5:21
 "Imelda" – 5:50
 "Father and Son" – 3:23
 "Golden Heart" – 4:53
 "Rüdiger" – 7:17
 "Cannibals" – 7:07
 "Je Suis Désolé" – 7:23
 "Last Exit to Brooklyn" – 2:16
 "Romeo and Juliet" – 7:49
 "Done with Bonaparte" – 5:08
 "A Night in Summer Long Ago" – 5:46
 "Brothers in Arms" – 8:30
 "Going Home" – 5:02
 "Are We in Trouble Now" – 6:03
 "Gravy Train" – 7:15

Personnel
 Mark Knopfler – vocals, guitar
 Richard Bennett – guitar
 Guy Fletcher – keyboards, backing vocals, acoustic guitar 
 Jim Cox – keyboards, backing vocals
 Glenn Worf – bass, backing vocals
 Chad Cromwell – drums
 Paul Franklin – pedal steel guitar
 Sonny Landreth – guitar
 Jools Holland – piano, organ
 Dónal Lunny – bouzouki
 Liam O'Flynn – uilleann pipes
 Seán Keane – violin
 Máirtín O'Connor – accordion
 Sonia Slany – violin
 Jules Singleton – violin
 Jocelyn Pook – viola
 Dinah Beamish – cello

References
Notes

Citations

Mark Knopfler video albums
1996 video albums
Live video albums
1996 live albums